Duperrey may refer to:

People
Louis Isidore Duperrey (1786–1865), a French sailor and explorer.

Island
Duperrey Island, also known as Mokil Atoll.

Fish
Thalassoma duperrey, also known as saddle wrasse.

Drink
Champagne Duperrey, a champagne produced by G.H. Martel & Cie in Avenay-Val-d'Or.